The 2004 NCAA Division II Men's Soccer Championship was the 33rd annual tournament held by the NCAA to determine the top men's Division II college soccer program in the United States.

Bobby McAlister's 70th minute goal broke a one-one tie and Seattle (22-0-1) defeated SIU Edwardsville in the tournament final, 2–1. It marked the ninth time a team finished a Div. II season without a loss. McAlister was named the offensive MVP of the Final Four. The final and semi-finals were played at the Midwestern State University Soccer Field in Wichita Falls, Texas.

This was the first national title for the Redhawks, who were coached by Pete Fewing.

Bracket

Final

See also  
 NCAA Division I Men's Soccer Championship
 NCAA Division III Men's Soccer Championship
 NAIA Men's Soccer Championship

References 

NCAA Division II Men's Soccer Championship
NCAA Division II Men's Soccer Championship
NCAA Division II Men's Soccer Championship
NCAA Division II Men's Soccer Championship
Seattle Redhawks men's soccer